Rudolph Michael Schindler (born Rudolf Michael Schlesinger; September 10, 1887 - August 22, 1953) was an Austrian-born American architect whose most important works were built in or near Los Angeles during the early to mid-twentieth century.

Although he worked and trained with some of its foremost practitioners, he often is associated with the fringes of the modernist movement in architecture. His use of complex three-dimensional forms, "warm" materials, and striking colors, as well as his ability to work within tight budgets, however, have placed him as one of the mavericks of early twentieth century architecture. Reyner Banham said he designed "as if there had never been houses before."

Early history

Rudolf Michael Schindler was born on September 10, 1887, to a middle-class Jewish family in Vienna, Austria. His father was a wood and metal craftsman and an importer; his mother was a dressmaker. He attended the Imperial and Royal High School, from 1899 to 1906, and enrolled at the Vienna University of Technology before attending the Vienna Academy of Fine Arts, or Wagnerschule, being graduated in 1911 with a degree in architecture. For unknown reasons, his family changed their surname from 'Schlesinger' to 'Schindler' in 1901.

Schindler was most influenced by professor Carl König, despite the presence of many other famous professors such as Otto Wagner and particularly, Adolf Loos. Most notably, in 1911, he was introduced to the work of Frank Lloyd Wright through the influential Wasmuth Portfolio.

Schindler also met his lifelong friend and rival Richard Neutra at the university in 1912, before completing his thesis project in 1913. Their careers would parallel each other: both would go to Los Angeles through Chicago, be recognized as important early modernists creating new styles suited to the Californian climate, and sometimes, both would work for the same clients. At one point, they and their wives shared a communal office and living structure that Schindler designed as his home and studio.

Early professional career

In Vienna, Schindler acquired experience in the firm of Hans Mayr and Theodore Mayer, working there from September 1911 to February 1914. Schindler then moved to Chicago to work in the firm of Ottenheimer, Stern, and Reichert (OSR), accepting a cut in pay to be in that progressive American city, which was the home of Frank Lloyd Wright. He found New York City, which he visited along the way, to be crowded, unattractive, and commercial. Chicago was more appealing to him, however, with less congestion and providing access to the architectural work of Henry Hobson Richardson, Louis Sullivan, and Frank Lloyd Wright.

Establishing contact with Wright

Schindler continued to seek contact with Wright, writing letters despite his limited English. He finally met him for the first time on December 30, 1914. Wright had little work at this stage, was still plagued by the destruction of Taliesin and the murder of his mistress earlier that year, and did not offer Schindler a job. Schindler continued work at OSR, keeping himself occupied with trips and study, notably familiarizing himself with the early tilt up slab work of Irving Gill.

Wright was able to hire Schindler after obtaining the commission for the Imperial Hotel in Tokyo, a major project that would keep the architect in Japan for several years. Schindler's role was to continue Wright's American operations in his absence, working out of Wright's Oak Park studio. In 1919, Schindler met and married Pauline Gibling (1893–1977) and in 1920 Wright summoned him to Los Angeles to work on the Barnsdall House.

Schindler was engaged to design several private commissions while in Los Angeles, notably, he completed what many think is his finest building, the Kings Road House, also known as the Schindler house or the Schindler-Chase house, as an office and home for two professional couples by late spring 1922. He and his wife were one of the couples living in the communal structure. He also started to take on several projects of his own.

During this time, fractures started to appear in the Schindler-Wright relationship. Schindler complained, with some validity, of being underpaid and exploited. As well as his architectural affairs, he was running Frank Lloyd Wright's businesses, such as the rental of the Oak Park houses.

Of the houses Wright built in this period, the Hollyhock House was undoubtedly the most significant, for which Schindler did most of the drawings and oversaw the construction of, while Frank Lloyd Wright still was in Japan. The client, Aline Barnsdall, subsequently chose Schindler as her architect to design a number of other small projects for her on Olive Hill and a spectacular beach-side 'translucent house' in 1927, which remains one of the great uncompleted projects of the twentieth century.

As Schindler was applying for a Los Angeles license to practice architecture in 1929, he mentioned his extensive work on the architectural and structural plans of the Imperial Hotel. Wright, however, refused to validate these claims. Eventually, disputes over whose work was whose, escalated until Schindler released a flier for a series of talks with Richard Neutra, describing himself as having been, "in charge of the architectural office of Frank Lloyd Wright for two years during his absence". Wright refuted this claim. The two split in 1931 and didn't reconcile until 1953, less than a year before Schindler's death.

Solo work

Schindler's early buildings usually are characterized by concrete construction. The Kings Road House, Pueblo Ribera Court, Lovell Beach House, Wolfe House, and How House are the projects most frequently identified among these.

The Kings Road house was designed as a studio and home for Schindler, his wife, and their friends Clyde and Marian DaCamara Chace. The floor plan worked itself around several L-shapes. Construction features included tilt up concrete panels cast on site, which contrasted with the more 'open' walls of redwood and glass. It has largely become the symbol of Schindler's architecture.

In a search to create a more inexpensive architecture, Schindler abandoned concrete and turned to the plaster-skin design. This type of construction is characteristic of his work throughout the 1930s and 1940s, but his interest in form and space never changed. The Rodriguez House appears in the film Pineapple Express.

He developed his own platform frame system, the Schindler Frame in 1945. His later work uses this system extensively as a basis for experimentation.

Recognition

Schindler's early work, such as the Kings Road House and Lovell Beach House, largely went unnoticed in the wider architectural world. As early and radical as they were for modernism, they may have been too different for recognition and Los Angeles was not a significant location on the architectural map. Schindler was not included in the highly influential International Style exhibit of 1932, while Richard Neutra was and, to add insult to injury, Neutra, incorrectly, was credited as the Austrian who worked on the Imperial Hotel with Wright.

His first major exposure came in Esther McCoy's 'Five California Architects' of 1960. His work is undergoing somewhat of a contemporary revaluation for its inventiveness, character, and formal qualities, which are making his designs familiar to a new generation of architects.

The Mackey Apartments and the Schindler Residence are maintained by the Friends of the Schindler House and the MAK Center for Art and Architecture. The MAK Center offers a variety of exhibitions and events. The center also sponsors six-month residencies for emerging architects and artists who are housed in the Mackey Apartments.

Selected projects (existing)
 1922 – Schindler House, 835 North Kings Road, West Hollywood, California 
 1922-1926 – Lovell Beach House, Newport Beach, Balboa Peninsula, California
 1923 – El Pueblo Ribera Court, La Jolla, California
 1925 – How House for James Eads How, Silverlake, Los Angeles, California
 City of Los Angeles Historic-Cultural Monument #895
 1926 – Manola Court apartment building for Herman Sachs, Edgecliff Drive, Los Angeles, California
 1928 – Wolfe House, Avalon, Catalina Island, California (demolished in 2002)
 1928-1952 – Samuel Freeman House (two guest apartments and furniture), Hollywood Heights, Los Angeles, California
 1930 – R. E. Elliot House, Newdale Drive, Los Angeles
 City of Los Angeles Historic-Cultural Monument #690
 1933 – W. E. Oliver House, Micheltorena Street, Los Angeles, California
 1933 – The Rainbow Ballroom, Denver (see also Verne Byers)
 1934 – J. J. Buck House, Genesee Street, Los Angeles, California
 City of Los Angeles Historic-Cultural Monument #122
 1934 – Bennati A-Frame house, Lake Arrowhead, California
 1935 – DeKeyser Duplex, Hollywood Heights, Los Angeles, California
 1937 – H. Rodakiewicz House, Los Angeles, California
 1938 – Bubeshko Apartments, Los Angeles, California
 City of Los Angeles Historic-Cultural Monument #831
 2017 Docomomo Award of Excellence for restoration 
 1938 – Wilson House, Los Angeles, California
 City of Los Angeles Historic-Cultural Monument #965
 1939 – Mackey Apartments, South Cochran Avenue, Los Angeles, California
 1940 – Van Dekker House, Woodland Hills, California
 1940 – House on Ellis Avenue, Inglewood, California
 1940 – S. Goodwin House, Studio City, California
 1944 – Bethlehem Baptist Church, 4900 S. Compton Ave., Los Angeles
 1948 – Laurelwood Apartments, Studio City, California
 City of Los Angeles Historic-Cultural Monument #228
 1950 – Tischler House, Los Angeles, California
 City of Los Angeles Historic-Cultural Monument #506
 1952 – Schlesinger House, Los Angeles, California

Quotes

"Can't you give me two lines, just two lines of recommendations without any hints at 'what a great man the boss is' and what poor fishes they are in comparison" — Schindler to Wright, while attempting to apply for his license to practice architecture

"My dear Rodolph Schindler: ... I am in receipt of a letter from the Board asking if you had made designs for me. The answer to that is, -- No you didn’t. Nobody makes designs for me. Sometimes if they are in luck, or rather if I am in luck, they make them with me. ... Nevertheless, I believe that you now are competent to design exceedingly good buildings. I believe that anything you would design would take rank in the new work being done in the country as worthy of respect." — Wright to Schindler, July 1929

"You further called it an exhibition of ‘California Architects’. Now it has become one of ‘Neutra and others’. I am quite willing to give Neutra the crown for his ability as a publicity man, but I am not willing to sail under his flag as an architect." — Schindler to Mrs. Frantl at MOMA in response to an upcoming exhibition, September 1935

"I consider myself the first and still one of the few architects who consciously abandoned stylistic sculptural architecture in order to develop space as a medium of art. ... I believe that outside of Frank Lloyd Wright I am the only architect in U.S. who has attained a distinct local and personal form language." — Schindler to Elisabeth Mock at MOMA, August 1943

"He has built quite a number of buildings in and around Los Angeles that seem to be admirable from the standpoint of design, and I have not heard of any of them falling down". — Wright

"He has a good mind, is affectionate in disposition, and is fairly honorable I believe. Personally, though strongly individual, he is not unduly eccentric and I, in common with many others, like him very much" — Wright

"Personally, I appreciate Rudolph. He is an incorrigible Bohemian and refuses to allow the Los Angeles barber to apply the razor to the scruff of his neck. He also has peculiarly simple and effective ideas regarding his own personal conduct. I believe, however, that he is capable as an artist. I have found him a too complacent and therefore a rotten superintendent. The buildings that he has recently built in Los Angeles are well designed, but badly executed. I suspect him of trying to give his clients too much for their money. I should say that was his extreme fault in these circumstances of endeavoring to build buildings" — Wright

"Rudolph was a patient assistant who seemed well aware of the significance of what I was then doing. His sympathetic appreciation never failed. His talents were adequate to any demands made upon them by me" — Wright at Schindler's Memorial Exhibition of 1954

Notes

Other sources

 

 reprinted in 1980 by Peregrine Smith
 reprinted in 1997 by William Stout Publishers

 reprinted in 1975 by Praeger

External links

Schindler's archive is kept at the Architecture & Design Collection (ADC) at the University Art Museum at the University of California, Santa Barbara (UCSB).
Finding Aid for Frank Lloyd Wright correspondence with R. M. Schindler, 1914-1929, Getty Research Institute 
Rudolf Michael Schindler at the aeiou Encyclopedia
 MAK-Center for Art and Architecture in the "Schindler-House", L.A.
 MAK-Center for Art and Architecture in co-operation with the Museum of Applied Arts, Vienna
Map with pictures of Rudolf Michael Schindler work around Los Angeles at platial.com
List of all projects by RM Schindler
List of writings by RM Schindler
Photos of "Schindler House" - West Hollywood, CA 
Schindler's Houses Schindlers Häuser - Film by Heinz Emigholz
Vintage Photos of Rodakiewicz House by Ned Scott
Edward Weston, R. M. Schindler, Anna Zacsek, Lloyd Wright, Lawrence Tibbett, Reginald Pole, Beatrice Wood and Their Dramatic Circles for much on the Schindlers' dramatic circles.
The Schindlers and Westons and the Walt Whitman School for much on the Schindlers' early years in Los Angeles.
The Schindlers and the Hollywood Art Association, 1921-1926 for much on the Schindlers' early Hollywood and artist connections.
The Schindlers in Carmel, 1924 for much on the Schindlers' early Carmel connections.
Schindlers-Westons-Kashevaroff-Cage and Their Avant-Garde Relationships for much on the friendship of the Schindlers and the Westons and their avant-garde circle.

1887 births
1953 deaths
20th-century American architects
20th-century Austrian people
Architects from Los Angeles
Architects from Vienna
American people of Austrian-Jewish descent
Austro-Hungarian emigrants to the United States
Austrian Jews
Jewish architects
Modernist architects